The Mersin Cup is a tennis tournament held in Mersin, Turkey since 2012. The event is part of the ATP Challenger Tour and is played on clay courts.

Past finals

Singles

Doubles

References

External links
TTF Site

 
ATP Challenger Tour
Tennis tournaments in Turkey
Clay court tennis tournaments